Bernard Darniche (born 28 March 1942 in Cenon, a commune in the Gironde department) is a French former rally driver. He won the European Rally Championship in 1976 and 1977 and the French Rally Championship in 1976 and 1978, each time behind the wheel of a Lancia Stratos HF. He also holds the record for most victories in the Tour de Corse which he won six times (1970, 1975, 1977, 1978, 1979 and 1981), a feat later equalled by Didier Auriol.

He competed in the first World Rally Championships in 1973, winning the 16th Moroccan Rally and placing second in the 44th Alpine Rally, and was one of the top competitors for the remainder of the decade. He finished third in the inaugural FIA Cup for Rally Drivers in 1977, the first of three successive top ten finishes in the drivers' championship.

He also won the Rallye Automobile Monte Carlo in 1979, the event where he holds the record for most wins on the infamous Col de Turini stage, a 1,600 m Alpine mountain pass normally driven in darkness. The so-called "Night of the Long Knives" has seen Darniche victorious on ten occasions.

WRC victories

Complete IMC results

24 Hours of Le Mans results

References

External links
Profile of Darniche and list of results, Rallybase.nl

1942 births
Living people
French rally drivers
European Rally Championship drivers
24 Hours of Le Mans drivers
World Rally Championship drivers
World Sportscar Championship drivers
Audi Sport drivers
BMW M drivers
Oreca drivers